The Chamber of Deputies Caucus of the Civic Democratic Party is a parliamentary group in the Czech Republic. It currently has 25 members.

Leadership

History
The caucus was established in 1991 when ODS split from Civic Forum. 33 Deputies joined the Caucus.

2013-2017
The Caucus was reduced to 16 members following the 2013 legislative election. Zbyněk Stanjura became the Chairman. Jiří Pospíšil left the Caucus in 2014 leaving it with 15 members. Pospíšil was then elected a Member of European Parliament and gave up his seat in the Chamber of Deputies. He was replaced by Vladislav Vilímec and the caucus returned to 16 seats. Alfred Beznoska left the Chamber in March 2017 and was replaced by Jan Skopeček.

Since 2017
The caucus consisted of 25 members following the 2017 election.

References 

Civic Democratic Party (Czech Republic)
Chamber of Deputies of the Czech Republic